The Essentials was released in 2002 and was the second greatest-hits collection of singer Laura Branigan that was issued in the United States. Many fans consider this to be superior to the previous compilation, The Best of Branigan, due to the inclusion of singles "Shattered Glass," "Moonlight on Water," "Never in a Million Years" and her introduction of the rock ballad "I Found Someone", all of which were missing from the previous release. The album is her last to be released before her death in 2004.

Track listing

References

2002 greatest hits albums
Laura Branigan albums
Atlantic Records compilation albums
Albums produced by David Kershenbaum